The Whitcombe River is a river of the West Coast Region of New Zealand's South Island. It flows north to reach the Hokitika River 30 kilometres south of Hokitika.

See also
List of rivers of New Zealand

References

Rivers of the West Coast, New Zealand
Rivers of New Zealand
Westland District